Clarissa; or, The History of a Young Lady: Comprehending the Most Important Concerns of Private Life. And Particularly Shewing, the Distresses that May Attend the Misconduct Both of Parents and Children, In Relation to Marriage is an epistolary novel by English writer Samuel Richardson, published in 1748. It tells the tragic story of a young woman, Clarissa Harlowe, whose quest for virtue is continually thwarted by her family. The Harlowes are a recently wealthy family whose preoccupation with increasing their standing in society leads to obsessive control of their daughter, Clarissa. It is considered one of the longest novels in the English language (based on estimated word count). It is generally regarded as Richardson's masterpiece.

In 2015, the BBC ranked Clarissa 14th on its list of the 100 greatest British novels. In 2013 The Guardian included Clarissa among the 100 best novels written in English.

Plot summary
Robert Lovelace, a wealthy "libertine" and heir to a substantial estate, begins to court Arabella, Clarissa's older sister. However, she rejects him because she felt slighted by his more ardent interest in her parents' approval than in her. Lovelace quickly moves on from Arabella to Clarissa, much to the displeasure of Arabella and their brother James. Clarissa insists that she dislikes Lovelace, but Arabella grows jealous of Lovelace's interest in the younger girl. James, also, dislikes Lovelace greatly because of a duel the two had once fought. These feelings combine with resentment that their grandfather had left Clarissa a piece of land and lead the siblings to be aggressive to Clarissa. The entire Harlowe family is in favour of her marrying Roger Solmes, however Clarissa finds Solmes to be unpleasant company and does not wish to marry him, either. This makes her family suspicious of her supposed dislike of Lovelace and they begin to disbelieve her.

The Harlowes begin restricting Clarissa's contact with the outside world by forbidding her to see Lovelace. Eventually they forbid her to either leave her room or send letters to her friend, Anna Howe, until Clarissa apologises and agrees to marry Solmes. Trapped and desperate to regain her freedom, Clarissa continues to communicate with Anna secretly and begins a correspondence with Lovelace while trying to convince her parents not to force her to marry Solmes. Neither Clarissa nor her parents will concede. They see her protests as stubborn disobedience and communication between parents and daughter breaks down. Lovelace convinces Clarissa to elope with him to avoid the conflict with her parents. Joseph Leman, a servant of the Harlowe family, shouts and makes noise so it may seem like the family has awoken and discovered that Clarissa and Lovelace are about to run away.

Frightened of the possible aftermath, Clarissa leaves with Lovelace but becomes his prisoner for many months. Her family now will not listen to or forgive Clarissa because of this perceived betrayal, despite her continued attempts to reconcile with them. She is kept at many lodgings, including unknowingly a brothel, where the women are disguised as high-class ladies by Lovelace so as to deceive Clarissa. Despite all of this, she continues to refuse Lovelace, longing to live by herself in peace.

Lovelace is too cynical to believe that virtuous women exist and he is desperately trying to seduce Clarissa, despite declaring that he loves her. Although he puts her under increasing pressure to submit, Clarissa does not waver. Under the pretense of saving her from a fire, Lovelace at last gains entry to Clarissa's bedroom but she thwarts his attempted assault with vigorous resistance. She promises, under threat of rape, to forgive and marry him. However, she considers this promise made under duress as void; soon after she makes her first successful escape from Lovelace, concealing herself in lodgings in Hampstead.

Enraged by Clarissa's flight, Lovelace vows to seek revenge. He hunts her down to the lodgings where she is hiding and rents all the rooms around her, effectively trapping her. He hires people to impersonate his own respectable family members to gain her trust. During this time he intercepts a letter to Clarissa from Anna Howe warning her of true extent of his deception and roguery. He commits forgery to put an end to the communication between them.

Eventually, he persuades Clarissa to accompany his imposter-relatives out in a carriage and thus carries her back to the disguised brothel. There, with the assistance of the prostitutes and brothel madam, he first drugs and then rapes her.

After the rape, Clarissa suffers a loss of sanity for several days, presumably brought on by her extreme distress as well as the dose of opiates administered to her. (This temporary insanity is represented in her "mad letters" by the use of scattered typography.)

When Clarissa recovers her senses Lovelace soon realises that he has failed to "subdue" or corrupt her; instead she is utterly repulsed by him, repeatedly refusing his offers of marriage despite her precarious situation as a fallen woman. She accuses him of deceiving and unlawfully detaining her and insists that he set her free. He continues to claim that the impersonators really were his family members and that his crime was simply one of desperate passion. He tries to convince her to marry him, alternating between threats and professions of love. She steadfastly resists and attempts several more escapes.

Lovelace is forced to concede that Clarissa's virtue remains untarnished, but he begins to convince himself that the "trial" was not properly conducted. Since Clarissa was drugged at the time, she could neither consent nor refuse. He decides to orchestrate a second rape, but without drugs. Pretending to be angered by the discovery that she has bribed a servant to help her escape, Lovelace begins to menace Clarissa, intending to escalate the confrontation to physical violence but she threatens to kill herself with a pen-knife should he proceed. Utterly confounded by her righteous indignation and terrified by her willingness to die for her virtue, Lovelace retreats.

More intent than ever to make Clarissa his wife, Lovelace is called away to attend his dying uncle from whom he is expecting to inherit an Earldom. He orders the prostitutes to keep Clarissa confined but well-treated until he returns. Clarissa escapes; however, the brothel madam is able to have her jailed for a few days for unpaid bills, and Clarissa finds sanctuary with a shopkeeper and his wife when she is released. Corresponding with Lovelace's real family, she discovers for herself the true extent of his deception. She lives in constant fear of being found by him again, as he continues to send her marriage offers through his disreputable friend, John Belford, as well as through his own family members. Clarissa is determined not to accept.  She becomes dangerously ill from the stress, rarely eating, convinced that she will die soon.

Her illness progresses. She and Belford become correspondents. She appoints him executor of her will as she puts all of her affairs in order to the alarm of the people around her. Belford is amazed at the way Clarissa handles her approaching death and laments what Lovelace has done. In one of the many letters sent to Lovelace, he writes, "if the divine Clarissa asks me to slit thy throat, Lovelace, I shall do it in an instance". 

Eventually, surrounded by strangers and her cousin, Col. Morden, Clarissa dies in the full consciousness of her virtue and trusting in a better life after death. Belford manages Clarissa's will and ensures that all her articles and money go into the hands of the individuals she desires should receive them.

Lovelace departs for Europe and continues to correspond with Belford. Lovelace learns that Col. Morden has suggested he might seek Lovelace and demand satisfaction on behalf of his cousin. He responds that he is not able to accept threats against himself and arranges an encounter with Col. Morden. They meet in Munich and arrange a duel. Morden is slightly injured in the duel, but Lovelace dies of his injuries the following day. Before dying he says "let this expiate!"

Clarissa's relatives finally realise they have been wrong but it comes too late. They discover Clarissa has already died. The story ends with an account of the fate of the other characters.

Characters
Major characters:

 Miss Clarissa Harlowe: The title character of the novel. Clarissa is a young and virtuous woman who ends up falling victim to Robert Lovelace after he convinces her to run away with him and later rapes her. Feeling as though she has entirely lost the will to live after losing her virtue, Clarissa prepares herself for death.
 Robert Lovelace: The villain of the story and pursuer of Clarissa. Mr. Lovelace is seen as a vile and selfish character who refuses to stop lusting after Clarissa until he gets what he wants.
 Anne Howe: Clarissa's best friend whom she continuously writes to throughout the course of the story. Anne serves as Clarissa's confidant as the story progresses.
 John Belford: A close friend of Mr. Lovelace whom he writes to during the course of the story. However, as the story progresses, he slowly begins to side with Clarissa instead of Mr. Lovelace.

Secondary characters:

 James Harlowe, Sr.: Clarissa's father
 Lady Charlotte Harlowe: Clarissa's mother
 James Harlowe, Jr.: Clarissa's brother, bitter enemy of Robert Lovelace.
 Miss Arabella Harlowe: Clarissa's older sister
 John Harlowe: Clarissa's uncle (her father's elder brother)
 Antony Harlowe: Clarissa's uncle (her father's younger brother)
 Roger Solmes: A wealthy man whom Clarissa's parents wish her to marry
 Mrs. Hervey: Clarissa's aunt (Lady Charlotte Harlowe)'s half-sister
 Dolly Hervey: Daughter of Mrs. Hervey
 Mrs. Norton: Clarissa's nurse, an unhappy widow
 Colonel Morden: A man of fortune, closely related to the Harlowe family
 Mrs. Howe: The mother of Miss Howe
 Mr. Hickman: Miss Howe's suitor
 Dr. Lewin: One of Clarissa's educators, a divine of great piety and learning
 Dr. H: A physician
 Mr. Elias Brand: A young clergyman
 Lord M.: Mr. Lovelace's uncle
 Lady Sarah Sadleir: Half-sister of Lord M., widow, lady of honour and fortune
 Lady Betty Lawrance: Half-sister of Lord M., widow, lady of honour and fortune
 Miss Charlotte: Niece of Lord M., maiden lady of character
 Patty Montague: Niece of Lord M., maiden lady of character
 Richard Mowbray: Libertine, gentleman, companion of Mr. Lovelace
 Thomas Doleman: Libertine, gentleman, companion of Mr. Lovelace
 James Tourville: Libertine, gentleman, companion of Mr. Lovelace
 Thomas Belton: Libertine, gentleman, companion of Mr. Lovelace
 Capt. Tomlinson: The assumed named of a pander that aids Mr. Lovelace
 Mrs. Moore: A widowed gentlewoman, keeping a lodging-house at Hampstead
 Miss Rawlins: A notable young gentlewoman in Hampstead
 Mrs. Bevis: A lively widow in Hampstead
 Mrs. Sinclair: The pretended name of a private brothel keeper in London; pretends to be Lady Betty
 Sally Martin: Assistant of, and partner with, Mrs. Sinclair
 Polly Horton: Assistant of, and partner with, Mrs. Sinclair
 Joseph Leman: Servant
 William Summers: Servant
 Hannah Burton: Servant
 Betty Barnes: Servant
 Dorcas Wykes: Servant

Response 
Clarissa is generally regarded by critics to be among the masterpieces of eighteenth-century European literature. Influential critic Harold Bloom cited it as one of his favourite novels that he "tend[ed] to re-read every year or so". The novel was well-received as it was being released. However, many readers pressured Richardson for a happy ending with a wedding between Clarissa and Lovelace. At the novel's end, many readers were upset, and some individuals even wrote alternative endings for the story with a happier conclusion. Some of the most well-known ones included happier alternative endings written by two sisters Lady Bradshaigh and Lady Echlin. Richardson felt that the story's morals and messages of the story failed to reach his audience properly. As such, in later editions of the novel, he attempted to make Clarissa's character appear purer while also Lovelace's character became more sinister in hopes of making his audience better understand his intentions in writing the novel.

The pioneering American nurse Clara Barton's full name was Clarissa Harlowe Barton, after the heroine of Richardson's novel.

Radio and television adaptations
The BBC adapted the novel as a television series in 1991, starring Sean Bean, Saskia Wickham, and Sean Pertwee.

BBC Radio 4 released a radio adaptation in March and April 2010, starring Richard Armitage and Zoe Waites.

See also

 Eneas Sweetland Dallas, editor of a 1868 abridged version of Clarissa
 Forced seduction
 Pamela; or, Virtue Rewarded
 Sir Charles Grandison

Citations

General sources
Most entries below from the Richardson Bibliography by John A. Dussinger

 John Carroll, "Lovelace as Tragic Hero", University of Toronto Quarterly 42 (1972): 14–25.
 Anthony Winner, "Richardson's Lovelace: Character and Prediction", Texas Studies in Literature and Language 14 (1972): 53–75.
 Jonathan Loesberg, "Allegory and Narrative in Clarissa", Novel 15 (Fall 1981): 39–59.
 Leo Braudy, "Penetration and Impenetrability in Clarissa", in New Aspects of the Eighteenth Century: Essays from the English Institute, ed. Phillip Harth (New York: Columbia Univ. Press, 1974).
 Terry Eagleton, The Rape of Clarissa: Writing, Sexuality, and Class Struggle in Samuel Richardson (Oxford: Blackwell, 1982).
 John Traugott, "Molesting Clarissa", Novel 15 (1982): 163–170.
 Sue Warrick Doederlein, "Clarissa in the Hands of the Critics", Eighteenth-Century Studies 16 (1983): 401–414.
 Terry Castle, "Lovelace's Dream", Studies in Eighteenth-Century Culture 13 (1984): 29–42.
 Sarah Fielding, "Remarks on 'Clarissa'", introduction by Peter Sabor (Augustan Reprint Society, 231–232). Facsimile reprint 1749 (Los Angeles: William Andrews Clark Memorial Library, 1985).
 Florian Stuber, "On Fathers and Authority in 'Clarissa'", 25 (Summer 1985): 557–574.
 Donald R. Wehrs, "Irony, Storytelling and the Conflict of Interpretation in Clarissa", ELH 53 (1986): 759–778.
 Margaret Anne Doody, "Disguise and Personality in Richardson's Clarissa", Eighteenth-Century Life n.s. 12, no. 2 (1988): 18–39.
 Jonathan Lamb, "The Fragmentation of Originals and Clarissa", SEL 28 (1988): 443–459.
 Raymond Stephanson, "Richardson's 'Nerves': The Philosophy of Sensibility in 'Clarissa'", Journal of the History of Ideas 49 (1988): 267–285.
 Peter Hynes, "Curses, Oaths, and Narrative in Richardson's 'Clarissa'", ELH 56 (1989): 311–326.
 Brenda Bean, "Sight and Self-Disclosure: Richardson's Revision of Swift's 'The Lady's Dressing Room'", Eighteenth-Century Life 14 (1990): 1–23.
 Thomas O. Beebee, "Clarissa" on the Continent: Translation and Seduction (University Park: Pennsylvania State Univ., 1990).
 Jocelyn Harris, "Protean Lovelace", Eighteenth-Century Fiction 2 (1990): 327–346.
 Raymond F. Hilliard, "Clarissa and Ritual Cannibalism", PMLA 105 (1990): 1083–1097.
 Nicholas Hudson, "Arts of Seduction and the Rhetoric of Clarissa", Modern Language Quarterly 51 (1990): 25–43.
 Helen M. Ostovich, "'Our Views Must Now Be Different': Imprisonment and Friendship in 'Clarissa'", Modern Language Quarterly 52 (1991): 153–169.
 Tom Keymer, Richardson's "Clarissa" and the Eighteenth-Century Reader (Cambridge: Cambridge Univ. Press, 1992). Probably the most important book-length study of Richardson after the first wave of Kinkead-Weakes, Doody, Flynn, and others in the 1970s and 1980s.
 David C. Hensley, "Thomas Edwards and the Dialectics of Clarissa's Death Scene", Eighteenth-Century Life 16, no. 3 (1992): 130–152.
 Lois A. Chaber, "A 'Fatal Attraction'? The BBC and Clarissa", Eighteenth-Century Fiction 4 (April 1992): 257–263.
 Mildred Sarah Greene, "The French Clarissa", in Man and Nature: Proceedings of the Canadian Society for Eighteenth-Century Studies, ed. Christa Fell and James Leith (Edmonton: Academic Printing & Publishing, 1992), pp. 89–98.
 Elizabeth W. Harries, "Fragments and Mastery: Dora and Clarissa", Eighteenth-Century Fiction 5 (April 1993): 217–238.
 Richard Hannaford, "Playing Her Dead Hand: Clarissa's Posthumous Letters", Texas Studies in Literature and Language 35 (Spring 1993): 79–102.
 Lois E. Bueler, Clarissa's Plots (Newark, DE: Associated Univ. Presses, 1994).
 Tom Keymer, "Clarissa's Death, Clarissa's Sale, and the Text of the Second Edition", Review of English Studies 45 (Aug. 1994): 389–396.
 Martha J. Koehler, "Epistolary Closure and Triangular Return in Richardson's 'Clarissa'", Journal of Narrative Technique 24 (Fall 1994): 153–172.
 Margaret Anne Doody, "Heliodorus Rewritten: Samuel Richardson's 'Clarissa' and Frances Burney's 'Wanderer'", in The Search for the Ancient Novel, ed. James Tatum (Baltimore: Johns Hopkins Univ. Press, 1994), pp. 117–131.
 Joy Kyunghae Lee, "The Commodification of Virtue: Chastity and the Virginal Body in Richardson's 'Clarissa'", The Eighteenth Century: Theory and Interpretation 36 (Spring 1995): 38–54.
 Mary Vermillion, "Clarissa and the Marriage Act", Eighteenth-Century Fiction 10 (1997): 395–412.
 Daniel P. Gunn, "Is Clarissa Bourgois Art?" Eighteenth-Century Fiction 10 (Oct. 1997): 1–14.
 Brian McCrea, "Clarissa's Pregnancy and the Fate of Patriarchal Power", Eighteenth-Century Fiction 9 (Jan. 1997): 125–148.
 Mary Patricia Martin, "Reading Reform in Richardson's 'Clarissa' and the Tactics of Sentiment", SEL 37 (Summer 1997): 595–614.
 Paul Gordon Scott, "Disinterested Selves: Clarissa and the Tactics of Sentiment", ELH 64 (1997): 473–502.
 Donnalee Frega, Speaking in Hunger: Gender, Discourse, and Consumption in "Clarissa" (Columbia, SC: Univ. of South Carolina Press, 1998).
 Laura Hinton, "The Heroine's Subjection: Clarissa, Sadomasochism, and Natural Law", Eighteenth-Century Studies 32 (Spring 1999): 293–308.
 Murray L. Brown, "Authorship and Generic Exploitation: Why Lovelace Must Fear Clarissa", SNNTS 30 (Summer 1998): 246–259.
 Derek Taylor, "Clarissa Harlowe, Mary Astell, and Elizabeth Carter: John Norris of Bemerton's Female 'Descendants'", Eighteenth-Century Fiction 12 (Oct. 1999): 19–38.
 
 .
 Townsend, Alex, Autonomous Voices: An Exploration of Polyphony in the Novels of Samuel Richardson, 2003, Oxford, Bern, Berlin, Bruxelles, Frankfurt/M., New York, Wien, 2003, 
  Hou, Jian. "Haoqiu Zhuan yu Clarissa: Liangzhong shehui jiazhi de aiqing gushi" (A Tale of Chivalry and Love and Clarissa: romantic fiction based on two distinct social value systems), Zhongguo xiaoshuo bijiao yanjiu, pp. 95–116.

External links
 
 Clarissa at Project Gutenberg
 
 

1748 novels
18th-century British novels
Epistolary novels
British novels adapted into television shows
Novels by Samuel Richardson
Novels about rape
Sentimental novels
Literary characters introduced in 1748